The 2009 Dwars door Vlaanderen was the 64th edition of the Dwars door Vlaanderen cycle race and was held on 25 March 2009. The race started in Roeselare and finished in Waregem. The race was won by Kevin van Impe.

General classification

References

2009
2009 in road cycling
2009 in Belgian sport
March 2009 sports events in Europe